Alexander Ross (15 January 1880 – 17 July 1953) was a stonemason, trade unionist and politician in Alberta, Canada. He served as an MLA in the Alberta Legislature from 1917 to 1926 and as a cabinet minister in the United Farmers of Alberta government from 1921 to 1926.

Early life
He was born in Premnoy, Scotland.

Start of his political career
Ross was elected in the 1917 Alberta election defeating Conservative Thomas Tweedie. He was elected as the first and only member of the Labor Representation League to sit in the assembly. The Labor Representation League later merged with the Dominion Labor Party (Alberta).

In the 1921 Alberta election after Calgary Centre was abolished he ran in the reconstituted Calgary riding and won the top spot in a 5-member block vote. In that election the United Farmers of Alberta defeated the Liberals in the rural part of the province, and formed the government. The United Farmers did not run any candidates in Calgary and Ross was asked to serve as Minister of Public Works despite being a member of the opposition.

Ross was acclaimed in a ministerial by-election on December 9, 1921.

In 1922 Ross helped found the Canadian Labor Party and served on its executive with other prominent labor politicians of the era, such as Elmer Ernest Roper and Alf Farmilo.

1926 election
Ross served out the rest of his second term as a minister, and his third term for the legislature until the 1926 Alberta general election. He was nominated by the Canadian Labor Party to run in Calgary, however the Calgary Herald reported that he did not appear to be enthusiastic to run, but would accept his nomination anyway.

Calgary elected its MLAs in a single multi-member district through Single transferable vote in 1926. It elected five MLAs. Ross placed sixth in the First Count ahead of five others including fellow Labour candidate Fred White. White gradually accumulated more votes than Ross through vote transfers as others were eliminated under STV rules. Ross was eliminated in the 8th Count, while White went on to be elected.

External links
Edmonton Labor Council in Municipal Politics 1903 - 1960 (Archived 2009-10-25)
United Farmers of Alberta: Years of Government, Alberta Heritage
Who's Who in the provincial election Calgary Herald June 22, 1926
Alex Ross will run in Calgary, Calgary Herald June 8, 1926
Legislative Assembly of Alberta Members Listing

References 

Dominion Labor Party (Alberta) MLAs
Alberta Labor Representation League MLAs
1880 births
1953 deaths
Members of the Executive Council of Alberta
British emigrants to Canada